Kilcommon, is a civil parish in the ancient barony of Ballinacor South in County Wicklow, Ireland. The parish is centered on the village of Tinahely. It is divided into 28 townlands

List of townlands
The civil parish contains 28 townlands. Today, for local administration purposes, it lies in the county of Wicklow and is administered by Wicklow County Council. Like all civil parishes in Ireland, this civil parish is derived from, and co-extensive with, a pre-existing parish of the Church of Ireland. The core of the parish is centered on the townland and village of Tinahely. The townland at the northern extremity is Kyle; to south it is bounded by the River Derry at Ballyshonog; to the west is the boundary with the barony of Shillelagh at Carrick; to the east lies Ballybeg at the Derry Water.

Ecclesiastical parishes

In the Church of Ireland, Kilcommon is today united with three other parishes that were formerly civil parishes in their own right. Today, the "Tinahely Carnew Union" consists of three parishes in the barony of Ballinacor South: Kilcommon, Preban (the church of St John) to the north, Kilpipe to the east of Kilcommon; it also includes the parish of Carnew (the church of All Saints) in the neighbouring barony of the Shilleagh to the south-west. There is an ecclesiastical parish of the Catholic Church in the civil parish called "St Kevin's Parish, Killavaney".

References
From 

Other sources

Civil parishes of County Wicklow